Spilonota laricana is a moth of the family Tortricidae. It is found in most of Europe (except the Iberian Peninsula and the Balkan Peninsula), China, Japan, Russia and the Nearctic realm.

The wingspan is about 15 mm. It was formerly considered to be a forma of Spilonota ocellana
Adults are on wing from June to August.

The larvae mainly feed on Larix species, but have also been recorded on other coniferous trees. Young larvae mine the needles of their host plant. After overwintering they feed on the young buds.

References

Eucosmini
Moths described in 1863
Moths of Japan
Moths of Europe
Taxa named by Hermann von Heinemann